Přechovice is a municipality and village in Strakonice District in the South Bohemian Region of the Czech Republic. It has about 100 inhabitants.

Geography
It lies in the Bohemian Forest Foothills. The municipality is situated on the right bank of the Volyňka River.

History

The first written mention of Přechovice is from 1400.

Transport
Přechovice is located on a railway line leading from Strakonice to Volary. The train stop in Přechovice is named Hoštice u Volyně after the neighbouring municipality.

Sights
The main landmark of Přechovice is the Chapel of Saint Anne Chapel. It was built in 1836, the stone cross in front of the chapel dates from 1861.

References

External links

Villages in Strakonice District